Kim Jung-hwan or Kim Jeong-hwan is the name of:

 Kim Jeong-hwan (poet) (born 1954), South Korean poet
 Kim Jung-hwan (fencer) (born 1983), South Korean fencer
 Kim Jeong-hwan (volleyball) (born 1988), South Korean volleyball player
 Kim Jeong-hwan (footballer), South Korean footballer
 Kim Jung-hwan (born 1990), South Korean singer better known as Eddy Kim